Acrocera subfasciata is a species of small-headed flies in the family Acroceridae.

Distribution
United States.

References

Acroceridae
Taxa named by John O. Westwood
Diptera of North America
Insects described in 1848